Wójcik, Wojczik, Wojczyk, Wojszyk (also archaic variants of phonetic spelling: Woicik, Woycik, Woyczik, Woytik, etc.) is one of the oldest and the fourth most common surname in Poland (100,064 in 2009).
Arhaic feminine forms are deriver by adding suffixes: -owa for married woman and -ówna for maiden name.

There are several suggested origins of the surname: diminutive from the occupation of wójt or from the given name Wojciech. It may also be a nickname by the bird wójcik (greenish warbler).

Feminine forms are Wójcik, Wójcikówna, Wójcikowa. Over the centuries, from many dialects arose multiple spellings for the Wójcik surname, including Woichik, Wojczyk, Woyzeck, Wojszyk, Wujcik, etc.

History
Early record of the Wójcik surname may be found in the Chronicles of Little Poland (13th century) We learn the knight Wójcik was a companion of King Wladyslaw of Poland and a member of his bodyguard. 
From medieval Łęczyca Court Files (14th century). (In 1395 Michno Wójcik of Wójciki pursued legal action against City of Łęczyca for take back an illegally annexed part of his estate during his absence.) 

Very rare noble families Wójcik bear different coats of arms:
Wójcik of Bialynia
Wójcik and Wojczyk of Pobog
Wójcik and Wójcikowski of Korab
Wójcik of German origin:  Silver, an eagle black, crowned gold.
de Wojcza, Wojczik and Wojszyk of Ogończyk
Wójcik and Wójsik of Ostoja
Wojszyk of Szeliga
Wojszek and Wójszyk of Łodzia
Wójcik of Lubicz
Wójcik of Rola
Wojsik and Wojszik of Łabędź
Wojszek and Wojszik of Piława
Wójsik and Wojszyk of Janina
In the 17th century appeared the family Wójcikiewicz (derived from family Wójcik) of the Bialynia coat of arms
Wójcikowski of the Nałęcz coat of arms. 

However, most families bearing the surnames Wójcik, Wójczyk, Wojszik, etc., (c. 90%) are derived from peasantry or burghers, as a result of popular adoptions of this surname between the 17th and 19th centuries. These families derived their surname from the named office of wójt or the first name Wojciech: son of Wojciech is also Wojcik.

People

Wójcik
 Adam Wójcik (1970–2017), Polish basketball player
 Aleksandra Wójcik (volleyball) (born 1994), Polish volleyball player
 Alexandra Wójcik (gymnast) (born 1985), Polish rhythmic gymnast
 Andżelika Wójcik (born 1996), Polish speed skater
 Dave Wojcik (born 1968), American college basketball coach
 Denis Wojcik, American author
 Doug Wojcik (born 1964), American college basketball coach and former player
 Janusz Wójcik (1953–2017), Polish politician and former footballer and coach
 Jerzy Wójcik (fencer) (1916–2004), Polish fencer
 John Wojcik (born 1942), American baseball player
 Jolanta Wójcik (born 1984), Polish athlete
 Katarzyna Wójcik (born 1983), Polish modern pentathlete
 Krzysztof Wójcik (disambiguation), several people
 Łukasz Wójcik, Polish glider pilot
 Magdalena Wójcik (born 1975), Polish singer, member of the band Goya
 Marek Wójcik (born 1980), Polish politician
 Michał Wójcik (born 1971), Polish politician
 Piotr Wójcik (born 1965), Polish athlete
 Rafał Wójcik (born 1972), Polish long distance runner
 Ryszard Wójcik (born 1956), Polish football referee
 Wacław Wójcik, Polish cyclist
 Ludvika Sivickaja-Vojcik

Wujcik 
 Erick Wujcik (1951–2008), American role-playing game designer
 Theo Wujcik (1936–2014),  American artist

See also 
 Wójcik-Fryszerka, a settlement in central Poland
 Voigt
 Wojciech, Vojtěch
 Woyzeck, Wozzeck
 Wójcicki
 Wojtowicz

References 

Polish-language surnames
Occupational surnames